Jakubów may refer to the following places in Poland:
Jakubów, Polkowice County in Lower Silesian Voivodeship (south-west Poland)
Jakubów, Świdnica County in Lower Silesian Voivodeship (south-west Poland)
Jakubów, Ząbkowice Śląskie County in Lower Silesian Voivodeship (south-west Poland)
Jakubów, Rawa County in Łódź Voivodeship (central Poland)
Jakubów, Skierniewice County in Łódź Voivodeship (central Poland)
Jakubów, Jędrzejów County in Świętokrzyskie Voivodeship (south-central Poland)
Jakubów, Włoszczowa County in Świętokrzyskie Voivodeship (south-central Poland)
Jakubów, Białobrzegi County in Masovian Voivodeship (east-central Poland)
Jakubów, Grójec County in Masovian Voivodeship (east-central Poland)
Jakubów, Gmina Goszczyn in Masovian Voivodeship (east-central Poland)
Jakubów, Mińsk County in Masovian Voivodeship (east-central Poland)
Jakubów, Przysucha County in Masovian Voivodeship (east-central Poland)

See also